The Hallenstadion (Zürich Indoor Stadium) is a multi-purpose facility located in the quarter of Oerlikon in northern Zürich. It is home to the ZSC Lions of the National League (NL) and has a capacity of 11,200 spectators. Designed by Bruno Giacometti, it opened on November 4, 1939, and was renovated in 2004–05.

The Lions are set to move out of the Hallenstadion at the end of the 2021/22 season to move in a new 12,000-seat arena a few kilometers away in the Altstetten area. Construction for the new Swiss Life Arena officially began on 6 March 2019, with completion scheduled for the summer of 2022.

Entertainment

Hallenstadion has been a top venue for entertainment in Switzerland as many international artists have performed at the venue, spanning a wide range of genres.

Sporting events
Bicycle race events were held in the Hallenstadion in its first year of service, 1939, and most years since then. The classic Zürcher 6-Tagerennen (Zürich 6-day race) began there in 1954, running on its characteristic oval of wooden boards, until the arena closed temporarily for renovation in 2004. The event is run there again now, in a more modern atmosphere.

The Hallenstadion hosted the Ice Hockey World Championships in 1998, along with Basel, and is the home stadium of the ZSC Lions ice hockey team. In February 2006, it hosted semi-finals and the final of the 2006 European Men's Handball Championship.

It had been the home of the annual Zürich Open, a WTA Tour tennis tournament that was discontinued after 25 years in 2008. On 21 December 2010, tennis returned to the arena with an exhibition featuring Roger Federer against Rafael Nadal, for the benefit of Federer's foundation.

On September 29, 2009, the Hallenstadion hosted the 2009 Victoria Cup. The game pit the NHL's Chicago Blackhawks against the Champions Hockey League title-holder, the Zurich Lions.

In April 2011, the 2011 IIHF Women's World Championship top division are being held at Hallenstadion ice rink hockey arena and at Deutweg rink (in Winterthur).

Other events
Among many others, in August 2005 the 14th Dalai Lama gave several teachings and initiations as well as a public talk on "The Art of Happiness" open for everyone within 10 days.

The 61st FIFA Congress was held at the Hallenstadion on 31 May and 1 June 2011, and the 65th FIFA Congress was held there on 28 May and 29 May 2015. The 2016 FIFA Extraordinary Congress took place at the venue on 26 February 2016.

See also
 List of tennis stadiums by capacity
 List of indoor arenas in Switzerland
 List of European ice hockey arenas

References

External links

  

Indoor ice hockey venues in Switzerland
Tennis venues in Switzerland
Music venues in Switzerland
Indoor arenas in Switzerland
Sports venues in Zürich
Boxing venues in Switzerland
Handball venues in Switzerland
Tourist attractions in Zürich
Sports venues completed in 1939
1939 establishments in Switzerland
Velodromes in Switzerland
20th-century architecture in Switzerland